Pavel Klhůfek (born 27 October 1991) is a Czech professional ice hockey player who currently playing for VHK Vsetín of the Chance Liga.

Career
Klhůfek began his career with his hometown HC Zlín, playing in their junior teams before joining HC Slavia Praha in 2009. He made his Czech Extraliga debut for Slavia Praha during the 2010-11 season. Klhůfek would spend the next four seasons dividing his time between Slavia Praha and loan spells with HC Berounští Medvědi and BK Havlíčkův Brod until January 30, 2015 where he signed for Orli Znojmo of the Erste Bank Eishockey Liga.

On June 5, 2017, Klhůfek returned to Zlín, eight years after leaving their junior team.

Career statistics

Regular season and playoffs

References

External links

1991 births
Living people
HC Berounští Medvědi players
Czech ice hockey forwards
BK Havlíčkův Brod players
HC Košice players
Orli Znojmo players
Piráti Chomutov players
HC Slavia Praha players
PSG Berani Zlín players
Sportspeople from Zlín
HKM Zvolen players
VHK Vsetín players
Czech expatriate ice hockey players in Slovakia